Prince of Chengyang may refer to:

Rulers of the Chengyang Kingdom during the Han and Jin periods
Liu Zhang (prince) (died 177 BC)
Mu Tipo (died 577), official who became a prince of Northern Qi